Staré Sedlo is a municipality and village in Tachov District in the Plzeň Region of the Czech Republic. It has about 300 inhabitants.

Administrative parts
Villages of Darmyšl and Racov are administrative parts of Staré Sedlo.

References

Villages in Tachov District